The Hong Kong International Film Festival (HKIFF), is one of Asia’s oldest international film festivals. Founded in 1976, the festival features different movies, filmmakers from different countries in Hong Kong.

HKIFF screens around 230 films from more than 60 countries in different major cultural venues across the territory every year. New films are featured as gala premieres, with the directors and cast presenting on the red carpet and meet-and-greet sessions in theatres.

The 46th edition of the festival was held from 15 August to 31 August 2022. The lineup included 204 films from 67 countries including 38 world, international or Asia premieres. Where the Wind Blows by Philip Yung and Warriors of Future by Ng Yuen-fai were opening films and Tori and Lokita by Jean-Pierre and Luc Dardenne was the closing film of the festival. A New Old Play by Qiu Jiongjiong won the 'Firebird Award' for the best film for the Young Cinema Competition.

History
Previously operated by Urban Council and Leisure and Cultural Services Department, from 1977 to 2001, and Hong Kong Arts Development Council, from 2002 to 2004, HKIFF was officially incorporated as an independent, charitable organisation – Hong Kong International Film Festival Society Limited after completing its 28th edition. The Hong Kong SAR Government has continued to subsidise the festival through venue provision and partial funding.
Since 2012, HKIFF produced and premiered anthologies of short films made by well-known award winning filmmakers from Asia, such as Ann Hui, Kiyoshi Kurosawa, Jia Zhangke, Brillante Mendoza, Hideo Nakata, Tsai Ming-liang, and Apichatpong Weerasethakul. Since 2017, HKIFF started to collaborate with Heyi Pictures to produce two feature films a year by young Chinese filmmakers that will hold their world premieres at HKIFF.

Past events

Competition
HKIFF Firebird Awards include three categories: Young Cinema Competition, Documentary Competition and Short Film Competition. The results are decided by three jury teams consisting of film industry professionals such as film critics, directors and film festival delegates. Besides Firebird Awards, HKIFF also established FIPRESCI Prize in HKIFF23 to recognize enterprising filmmakers and promotes young talent in Asian cinema. Starting from HKIFF41, Audience Choice Award is held during the film festival when the audience members who purchased tickets and festival passes could vote for their favorite films. From HKIFF43, the Young Cinema Competition was divided into "Chinese Language" and "World" sections.

See also 
 List of film festivals
 List of film festivals in China

References

Notes

External links

IMDb: Hong Kong International Film Festival



Film festivals in Hong Kong